Dikaya Gar is a rural locality (a village) in Kultayevskoye Rural Settlement, Permsky District, Perm Krai, Russia. The population was 103 as of 2010. There are 7 streets.

Geography 
Dikaya Gar is located 29 km southwest of Perm (the district's administrative centre) by road. Polyudovo is the nearest rural locality.

References 

Rural localities in Permsky District